Rycerzewko may refer to:

 Rycerzewko, Kuyavian-Pomeranian Voivodeship, Poland
 Rycerzewko, West Pomeranian Voivodeship, a village in Gmina Świdwin, Poland

See also
Rycerzewo (disambiguation)